Vincent Pelo (born 22 April 1988) is a French rugby union player. He is the cousin of Dimitri Pelo and Aliki Fakate. He currently plays for French club Bayonne as a Loosehead Prop. Pelo is a native of Wallis. He was part of the French national under-20 rugby union team at the 2008 IRB Junior World Championship.

He made his French international debut coming off the bench against Wales in the 2016 Six Nations Championship.

References

External links
France profile at FFR
It's Rugby Profile
La Rochelle Profile

1988 births
Living people
French rugby union players
Rugby union props
Rugby union players from Wallis and Futuna
France international rugby union players